The Old Hamam of Vushtrri (also known as the Gazi Ali Bey Hamam) is one of the oldest and most prominent monuments in Vučitrn, Kosovo.

History
Gazi Ali Bey Hamam is located in the old city center of Vučitrn, and was built by Gazi Ali Bey at the turn of the 14th and 15th centuries. Public baths were included for both sexes. The technically sophisticated building is an example of a "Tek" hamam, including a large lobby covered by a massive octagonal dome, a second room for heating and cleaning, and two alcoves paved with white marble for each gender to bathe. A kurna (stone bath) in each alcove was supplied by the central hot water tank. The women's alcove is similar in design to that in the Peć Hamam. Clearly, the structure was built in two stages: the original floor and the three lower domes, the first; followed by the outer entryway of volcanic tuff dating to the 17th century and spanning the entire perimeter of the building. Unused since the 1970s, the facility was renovated with a focus on its façade and cupola from August 2013 to May 2014.

See also 
 Gazi Ali Beg Mosque
 List of monuments in Vushtrri

Gallery

References

Ottoman baths in Kosovo
Historic sites in Kosovo
Cultural heritage monuments in Vushtrri